The 1979 Campeonato Ecuatoriano de Fútbol de la Serie A was the 21st national championship for football teams in Ecuador.

Teams
The number of teams for this season was played by 12 teams. Aucas and Manta promoted as winners of First Stage of Serie B.

First stage

Second stage

Liguilla Final

References

External links
 RSSSF - Ecuador 1979
 Artículo Oficial de Emelec Campeón Nacional 1979 en la página web del Diario El Universo
 archivo futbol ecuatoriano - NOTA 1979
 archivo futbol ecuatoriano - AÑO 1979
 Línea de Tiempo de eventos y partidos de Liga Deportiva Universitaria
 Calendario de partidos históricos de Liga Deportiva Universitaria
 Sistema de Consulta Interactiva y Herramienta de consulta interactiva de partidos de Liga Deportiva Universitaria

1979
Ecu